Domenico Fossati was born at Venice in 1743, and studied painting at the Accademia di Belle Arti of that city. He distinguished himself as a painter of architecture and a decorator, and his works are to be met with in the theatres and palaces of Venice, Padua, Vicenza, Verona, Udine, Monza, and Gratz, and in the Scala at Milan. He died at Venice in 1785.

References
 

18th-century Italian painters
Italian male painters
1743 births
1785 deaths
Painters from Venice
Accademia di Belle Arti di Venezia alumni
18th-century Italian male artists